In 2014 there was no primary outdoor global athletics championship, as neither the Summer Olympics nor the World Championships in Athletics occurred in the year. The 2014 IAAF World Indoor Championships, and the 2014 IAAF Continental Cup were the foremost global events to be held in 2014. The 2014 IAAF World Relays marked the debut of the new international competition exclusively for relay races.

The Diamond League entered its fifth year as the foremost seasonal track and field series. The 2014 IAAF World Half Marathon Championships and the 2014 IAAF World Race Walking Cup were the highest level competitions for those disciplines. Major regional events which took place in 2014 include the European Championships, African Championships, and Commonwealth Games.

Major events

World

World Indoor Championships in Athletics
World Junior Championships in Athletics
Continental Cup
Commonwealth Games
Summer Youth Olympics
IAAF Diamond League
World Marathon Majors
World Half Marathon Championships
IAAF World Race Walking Cup
WMRA World Mountain Running Championships

Regional

African Championships
Asian Indoor Championships
Asian Junior Championships
Asian Race Walking Championships
Asian Games
Central American and Caribbean Games
Central American Championships
European Athletics Championships
European Cross Country Championships
European Cup Winter Throwing
European Cup 10,000m
European Mountain Running Championships
European Team Championships
Ibero-American Championships
Lusophony Games
Micronesian Games
NACAC Cross Country Championships
South American Games
South American U23 Championships
South American Cross Country Championships
South Asian Junior Championships
Oceania Athletics Championships
Oceania Cross Country Championships

National 
 2014 British Athletics Championships
 2014 German Athletics Championships
 2014 Italian Athletics Championships
 2014 Japan Championships in Athletics
 2014 Russian Championships in Athletics
 2014 USA Outdoor Track and Field Championships

Marathons
 Tokyo Marathon
 Boston Marathon
 London Marathon
 Berlin Marathon
 Chicago Marathon
 New York City Marathon

World records

Indoor

Outdoor

Results

 November 10, 2013 – February 15, 2014: 2014 IAAF Cross Country Permit
 November 10, 2013, at  Soria
 Men's winner:  Dickson Huru
 Women's winner:  Marta Tigabea Mekonen
 November 17, 2013, at  Burgos
 Men's winner:  Imane Merga
 Women's winner:  Hiwot Ayalew
 December 22, 2013, at  Brussels
 Men's winner:  Alex Kibet
 Women's winner:  Sifan Hassan
 January 4, 2014, at  Antrim
 Men's winner:  Japhet Korir
 Women's winner:  Mimi Belete
 January 6, 2014, at  San Giorgio su Legnano
 Men's winner:  Albert Rop
 Women's winner:  Hiwot Ayalew
 January 11, 2014, at  Edinburgh
 Men's 4 km winner:  Garrett Heath
 Men's 8 km winner:  Chris Derrick
 Women's (6 km) winner:  Gemma Steel
 January 19, 2014, at  Seville
 Men's winner:  Paul Tanui
 Women's winner:  Hiwot Ayalew
 January 26, 2014, at  San Vittore Olona
 Men's winner:  Paul Tanui
 Women's winner:  Faith Kipyegon
 February 2, 2014, at  Albufeira
 Men's winner:  Mohamed Moustaoui
 Women's winner:  Hiwot Ayalew
 February 9, 2014, at  Chiba
 Event cancelled, due to snow storms
 February 9, 2014, at  Diekirch
 Men's winner:  Zersenay Tadese
 Women's winner:  Eleni Gebrehiwot
 February 15, 2014, at  Nairobi
 Men's winner:  Bedan Karoki
 Women's winner:  Faith Kipyegon
 January 2 – December 31: 2014 IAAF Road Race Label Events
 NB: An event in bold text depicts it as part of the World Marathon Majors series
 Gold Level
 January 2:  Xiamen International Marathon
 Winners:  Mariko Kiplagat (m) /  Mare Dibaba (f)
 January 24:  Dubai Marathon
 Winners:  Tsegaye Mekonnen (m) /  Mula Seboka (f)
 February 23:  World's Best 10K in San Juan
 Winners:  Bedan Karoki (m) /  Mary Wacera (f)
 February 23:  Tokyo Marathon (WMM #1)
 Winners:  Dickson Chumba (m) /  Tirfi Tsegaye (f)
 March 2:  Lake Biwa Marathon
 Winner:  Bazu Worku
 March 2:  Roma-Ostia Half Marathon
 Winners:  Aziz Lahbabi (m) /  Caroline Chepkwony
 March 9:  Nagoya Women's Marathon
 Winner:  Mariya Konovalova
 March 16:  EDP Half Marathon of Lisbon
 Winners:  Bedan Karoki (m) /  Werknesh Degefa (f)
 March 16:  Seoul International Marathon
 Winners:  Yacob Jarso (m) /  Helah Kiprop (f)
 March 23:  Maratona di Roma
 Winners:  Shume Hailu (m) /  Geda Ayelu Lemma (f)
 April 5:  Sportisimo Prague Half Marathon
 Winners:  Peter Cheruiyot Kirui (m) /  Joyce Chepkirui (f)
 April 6:  Schneider Electric Marathon de Paris
 Winners:  Kenenisa Bekele (m) /  Flomena Cheyech (f)
 April 13:  ABN AMRO Marathon Rotterdam
 Winners:  Eliud Kipchoge (m) /  Abebech Afework (f)
 April 13:  London Marathon (WMM #2)
 Winners:  Wilson Kipsang Kiprotich (m) /  Edna Kiplagat (f)
 April 13:  Vienna City Marathon
 Winners:  Getu Feleke (m) /  Anna Hahner (f)
 April 20:  Yangzhou Jianzhen International Half Marathon
 Winners:  Nguse Amlosom (m) /  Gladys Cherono (f)
 April 21:  Boston Marathon (WMM #3)
 Winners:  Meb Keflezighi (m) /  Rita Jeptoo (f)
 May 11:  Volkswagen Prague Marathon
 Winners:  Patrick Kipyegon Terer (m) /  Firehiwot Dado (f)
 May 18:  Bupa Great Manchester Run
 Winners:  Kenenisa Bekele (m) /  Tirunesh Dibaba (f)
 July 6:  Gold Coast Airport Marathon
 Winners:  Silah Limo (m) /  Asami Kato (f)
 July 27:  Bogotá International Half Marathon
 Winners:  Geoffrey Kamworor Kipsang (m) /  Rita Jeptoo (f)
 September 6:  Birell Prague Grand Prix 10 km
 Winners:  Geoffrey Ronoh (m) /  Correti Jepkoech (f)
 September 7:  BUPA Great North Run
 Winners:  Mo Farah (m) /  Mary Jepkosgei Keitany (f)
 September 28:  Berlin Marathon (WMM #4)
 Winners:  Dennis Kipruto Kimetto (World Record) (m) /  Tirfi Tsegaye (f)
 September 28:  Carrera de la Mujer
 Winner:  Belaynesh Oljira
 October 5:  Rock 'n' Roll Vodafone Half Marathon of Portugal
 Winners:  Stephen Kosgei Kibet (m) /  Purity Rionoripo (f)
 October 5:  Rock 'n' Roll Maratona de Lisboa EDP
 Winners:  Samuel Ndungu (m) /  Visiline Jepkesho (f)
 October 5:  Bank of Scotland Great Scottish Run
 Winners:  Stephen Mokoka (m) /  Edna Kiplagat (f)
 October 12:  Bank of America Chicago Marathon (WMM #5)
 Winners:  Eliud Kipchoge (m) /  Rita Jeptoo (f)
 October 19:  TCS Amsterdam Marathon
 Winners:  Bernard Kipyego (m) /  Betelhem Moges (f)
 October 19:  Beijing Marathon
 Winners:  Girmay Birhanu (m) /  Fatuma Sado (f)
 October 26:  Great South Run
 Winners:  James Rungaru (m) /  Belaynesh Oljira (f)
 October 26:  Frankfurt Marathon
 Winners:  Mark Kiptoo (m) /  Aberu Kebede (f)
 November 2:  TCS New York City Marathon (final WMM)
 Winners:  Wilson Kipsang Kiprotich (m) /  Mary Jepkosgei Keitany (f)
 November 2:  Shanghai Marathon
 Winners:  Stephen Mokoka (m) /  Tigist Tufa (f)
 November 16:  Istanbul Marathon
 Winners:  Hafid Chani (m) /  Amane Gobena (f)
 December 7:  Fukuoka Marathon (men only) (co-final)
 Winner:  Patrick Makau Musyoki
 December 7:  Singapore Marathon (co-final)
 Winners:  Kenneth Mburu Mungara (m) /  Waganesh Amare (f)
 Silver Level
 January 26:  Osaka International Ladies Marathon
 Winner:  Tetyana Hamera-Shmyrko
 February 2:  Beppu-Ōita Marathon
 Winner:  Abraham Kiplimo
 February 2:  Kagawa Marugame Half Marathon
 Winners:  Martin Mathathi (m) /  Eri Makikawa (f)
 February 16:  Hong Kong Marathon
 Winners:  Feyera Gemeda (m) /  Rehima Kedir (f)
 April 6:  Great Ireland Run
 Winners:  Japhet Korir (m) /  Iwona Lewandowska (f)
 April 6:  Daegu Marathon
 Winners:  Yemane Tsegay (m) /  Mulu Seboka (f)
 April 27:  Hannover Marathon
 Winners:  Henry Chirchir (m) /  Souad Aït Salem (f)
 April 27:  Madrid Marathon
 Winners:  Ezekiel Kiptoo Chebii (m) /  Alem Frike (f)
 May 24 & 25:  Ottawa Race Weekend
 Winners (10k race):  Wilson Kiprop (m) /  Mary Jepkosgei Keitany (f)
 Winners (marathon):  Yemane Tsegay (m) /  Tigist Tufa (f)
 May 31:  Freihofer's Run for Women
 Winner:  Lucy Kabuu
 June 7:  Mattoni České Budějovice Half Marathon
 Winners:  Geoffrey Kipsang (m) /  Betelhem Moges (f)
 June 21:  Mattoni Half Marathon Olomouc
 Winners:  Geoffrey Ronoh (m) /  Edna Kiplagat (f)
 September 14:  Mattoni Ústí nad Labem Half Marathon
 Winners:  Adugna Takele (m) /  Correti Jepkoech (f)
 September 21:  Dam tot Damloop
 Winners:  John Nzau Mwangangi (m) /  Linet Masai (f)
 September 21:  Blackmores Sydney Marathon
 Winners:  Gebo Burka (m) /  Biruktayit Eshetu (f)
 October 19:  BUPA Great Birmingham Run
 Winners:  Joel Kimutai (m) /  Poline Wanjiku (f)
 October 19:  Media Maraton Valencia Trinidad Alfonso (half marathon)
 Winners:  Abraham Cheroben (m) /  Emily Chebet (f)
 October 19:  Toronto Waterfront Marathon
 Winners:  Laban Korir (m) /  Mulu Seboka (f)
 October 26:  Venice Marathon
 Winners:  Behailu Mamo (m) /  Konjit Tilahun (f)
 October 26:  Marseille Cassis 20km
 Winners:  Titus Mbishei (m) /  Peris Chepchirchir (f)
 November 16:  Yokohama Women's Marathon
 Winner:  Tomomi Tanaka
 December 28:  Corrida de Houilles
 Winners:  Victor Chumo (m) /  Peris Jepchichir (f)
 December 31:  San Silvestre Vallecana (final)
 Winners:  Mike Kigen (m) /  Gemma Steel (f)
 Bronze Level
 February 23:  Maraton Ciudad de Sevilla
 Winners:  Cosmas Kiplimo Legat (m) /  Pamela Rotich (f)
 April 6:  Maraton de Santiago
 Winners:  Beraki Beyene (m) /  Emily Perpetua Chepkorir (f)
 April 6:  Brighton Marathon
 Winners:  William Chebor (m) /  Alice Milgo (f)
 April 6:  Milano City Marathon
 Winners:  Francis Kiprop (m) /  Visiline Jepkesho (f)
 April 13:  Pyongyang Marathon
 Winners:  Pak Chol (m) /  Kim Hye-Gyong (f)
 April 13:  Łódź Maraton Dbam o Zdrowie
 Winners:  Yared Shegumo (m) /  Karolina Jarzyńska (f)
 April 20:  Nagano Olympic Commemorative Marathon
 Winners:  Serhiy Lebid (m) /  Alina Prokopeva (f)
 May 18:  Nordea Riga Marathon
 Winners:  Yu Chiba (m) /  Tigist Teshome Ayanu (f)
 May 18:  Gifu Seiryu Half Marathon
 Winners:  Bedan Karoki (m) /  Visiline Jepkesho (f)
 May 25:  Edinburgh Marathon
 Winners:  David Toniok (m) /  Kateryna Stetsenko (f)
 June 1:  Lanzhou International Marathon
 Winners:  Gilbert Kiptoo Chepkwony (m) /  Eunice Kirwa Jepkirui (f)
 June 14:  Corrida de Langueux – Côtes d'Armor
 Winners:  Victor Kimutai Chumo (m) /  Angela Tanui (f)
 June 28:  Vidovdan Road Race
 Winners:  Darko Živanović (m) /  Anikó Kálovics (f)
 September 21:  Siberian International Marathon
 Winners:  John Kyalo Kyui (m) /  Purity Kimetto (f)
 November 9:  Banque du Liban Beirut Marathon
 Winners:  Fikadu Girma (m) /  Mulahabt Tsega (f)
 November 9:  Marathon des Alpes-Maritimes Nice-Cannes
 Winners:  Shume Hailu (m) /  Rose Jepchumba (f)
 November 16:  Maraton Valencia Trinidad Alfonso (full marathon)
 Winners:  Jacob Kendagor (m) /  Beata Naigambo (f)
 December 13:  Zhuhai International Half Marathon (final)
 Winners:  MA Jinguo (m) /  SUN Lamei (f)
 February 1 – 15: 2014 IAAF Indoor Permit
 February 1: Weltklasse in Karlsruhe in  Karlsruhe
 Host nation, won both the gold and overall medal tallies.
 February 2: Russian Winter Meeting in  Moscow
 Host nation, won both the gold and overall medal tallies.
 February 6: XL Galan in  Stockholm
 Seven different national teams won one gold medal each. However, host nation, won the overall medal tally.
 February 8: Boston Indoor Games in  Roxbury, Boston
 Host nation, won both the gold and overall medal tallies.
 February 9: Indoor Flanders Meeting in  Ghent
  won the gold medal tally.  won the overall medal tally.
 February 15: British Athletics Grand Prix in  Birmingham
 Host nation, and  share the gold medal tally, with 3 golds each. Also,  won the overall medal tally.
 February 2 – August 17: 2014 IAAF Race Walking Challenge
 February 2: Oceania Race Walking Championships in  Hobart
 Winners:  Dane Bird–Smith (m) /  Kelly Ruddick (f)
 February 15 & 16: South American Race Walking Championships in  Cochabamba
 Winners:  Ronaldo Saquipay (m) /  Kimberley Garcia (f)
 February 22: Circuito Internacional de Marcha Chihuahua in  Chihuahua
 Men's 20 km race winner:  Eider Arévalo
 Women's 20 km race winner:  Sandra Arenas
 Men's 50 km race winner:  José Leyver
 March 16: Lugano Trophy – 12th Memorial Mario Albisetti in  Lugano
 Winners:  Ruslan Dmytrenko (m) /  Liu Hong (f)
 March 16: Asian Race Walking Championships in   Nomi, Ishikawa
 Winners:  Kim Hyun-sub (m) /  Zhou Tongmei (f)
 March 22: Dudinska Paldesjatka (D-50-km) in  Dudince
 Men's 20 km race winner:  Matej Tóth
 Women's 20 km race winner:  Ainhoa Pinedo
 Men's 50 km race winner:  Rafał Augustyn
 April 5: Grande Prémio Internacional de Rio Maior em Marcha Atlética in  Rio Maior
 Winners:  Caio Bonfim (m) /  Vera Santos (f)
 April 12: Poděbrady 2014 in the 
 Winners:  Matej Tóth (m) /  Anežka Drahotová (f)
 May 31: XXVIII Gran Premio Cantones de La Coruña in  A Coruña
 Winners:  Erick Barrondo (m) /  Liu Hong (f)
 August 10–14: Part of the 2014 African Championships in Athletics in  Marrakesh
 Winners:  Lebogang Shange (m) /  Grace Wanjiru (f)
 August 12–17: Part of the 2014 European Athletics Championships (final)
 Men's 20 km race winner:  Miguel Ángel López
 Women's 20 km race winner:  Elmira Alembekova
 Men's 50 km race winner:  Yohann Diniz
 Overall winners:  Ruslan Dmytrenko (m) /  Liu Hong (f)
 March 7–9: 2014 IAAF World Indoor Championships at  Sopot
 The  won both the gold and overall medal tallies.
 March 22 – September 7: 2014 IAAF World Challenge
 March 22: IAAF World Challenge in  Melbourne
 Host nation, won both the gold and overall medal tallies.
 May 3: Jamaica International Invitational in  Kingston
  won both the gold and overall medal tallies.
 May 11: Seiko Golden Grand Prix Tokyo in 
  won both the gold and overall medal tallies.
 May 17: Ponce Grand Prix in 
  won both the gold and overall medal tallies.
 May 21: IAAF World Challenge in  Beijing
 Host nation, won both the gold and overall medal tallies.
 June 8: Meeting International Mohammed VI d'Athlétisme de Rabat in 
  won the gold medal tally. Host nation, won the overall medal tally.
 June 8: IWC Meeting – Hengelo in the 
 The  won both the gold and overall medal tallies.
 June 17: 53rd Golden Spike Ostrava in the 
  and the  won 3 gold medals each.  and the United States won 6 overall medals each.
 July 19: 32nd Meeting Madrid 2014 in 
  and the  won 2 gold medals each. However, the United States won the overall medal tally.
 August 10: Grande Premio Brasil Caixa Governo do Pará in  Belém
 Host nation, won both the gold and overall medal tallies.
 August 31: ISTAF Berlin in 
  and host nation, won 3 gold medals each. However, the  won the overall medal tally.
 September 2: IAAF World Challenge Zagreb in 
 Host nation, and the  won 2 gold medals each. Kenya and the United States won 5 overall medals each.
  won the gold medal tally. Host nation, won the overall medal tally.
 March 29: 2014 IAAF World Half Marathon Championships at  Copenhagen
 Men's individual winner:  Geoffrey Kipsang Kamworor
 Men's team winner: 
 Women's individual winner:  Gladys Cherono
 Women's team winner: 
 May 3 & 4: 2014 IAAF World Race Walking Cup at  Taicang
 Host nation, and  won 4 gold medals each. However, China won the overall medal tally.
 May 9 – September 5: 2014 IAAF Diamond League
 May 9: Doha Diamond League in 
  won both the gold and overall medal tallies.
 May 18: Shanghai Golden Grand Prix in 
 The  won both the gold and overall medal tallies.
 May 31: Prefontaine Classic in the 
 June 5: Golden Gala – Pietro Mennea in  Rome
  and the  won 3 gold medals each. However, the United States won the overall medal tally.
 June 11: Bislett Games in  Oslo
 The  won both the gold and overall medal tallies.
 June 14: Adidas Grand Prix in  New York City
 Host nation, the  won both the gold and overall medal tallies.
 July 3: Athletissima in  Lausanne
  won both the gold and overall medal tallies.
 July 5: Meeting Areva in  Saint-Denis (Paris)
  won both the gold and overall medal tallies.
 July 11 & 12: British Athletics Grand Prix #1 in  Glasgow
  won both the gold and overall medal tallies.
 July 18: Herculis in 
  won both the gold and overall medal tallies.
 August 21: DN Galan in  Stockholm
  won both the gold and overall medal tallies.
 August 24: British Athletics Grand Prix #2 in  Birmingham
  and  won 4 gold medals each. However, Kenya won the overall medal tally.
 August 28: Weltklasse Zürich in 
 The  won both the gold and overall medal tallies.
 September 5: Memorial Van Damme (final) in  Brussels
 The  won both the gold and overall medal tallies.
 For the overall winners of the 2014 IAAF Diamond League, click here.
 May 11 – September 7: 2014 IAAF Hammer Throw Challenge
 Winner:  Betty Heidler
 Winners:  Krisztián Pars (m) /  Amanda Bingson (f)
 May 21: Part of the IAAF World Challenge in Beijing
 Winner:  Wang Zheng
 June 7: 60th Janusz Kusociński Memorial in  Szczecin
 Winner:  Krisztián Pars
 June 8: Meeting International Mohammed VI d'Athlétisme de Rabat (with the IAAF World Challenge at the same time)
 Winner:  Kathrin Klaas
 June 12: Moscow Challenge in 
 Winners:  Dilshod Nazarov (m) /  Wang Zheng (f)
 June 17: 53rd Golden Spike Ostrava (with the IAAF World Challenge at the same time)
 Winners:  Krisztián Pars (m) /  Betty Heidler (f)
 June 25: Paavo Nurmi Games in  Turku
 Winner:  Krisztián Pars
 July 1: 19th International Athletic Meeting in Honor of Miner's Day in  Velenje
 Winner:  Paweł Fajdek
 Note: Not sure, if this event was part of this year's Hammer Throw Challenge or not.
 July 8: István Gyulai Memorial in  Székesfehérvár
 Winners:  Krisztián Pars (m) /  Anita Włodarczyk (f)
 July 16: Karlstad Grand Prix in 
 Winner:  Dilshod Nazarov
 July 19: 32nd Meeting Madrid 2014 (with the IAAF World Challenge at the same time)
 Winner:  Dilshod Nazarov
 August 31: ISTAF Berlin (with the IAAF World Challenge at the same time)
 Winner:  Anita Włodarczyk (New World Record: 79.58m)
 September 7: Rieti Meeting (final and with the IAAF World Challenge at the same time)
 Winner:  Paweł Fajdek
 Overall winners:  Krisztián Pars (m) /  Anita Włodarczyk (f)
 April 3 – October 3: 2014 IAAF World Combined Events Challenge
 April 3 & 4: Oceania Combined Events Championships in  Melbourne
 Decathlon winner:  Jake Stein (7,564 points) (in dispute)
 Heptathlon winner:  Sophie Stanwell (5,624 points)
 May 2 & 3: 27th Multistars – Trofeo Zerneri Acciai in  Florence
 Decathlon winner:  Eelco Sintnicolaas (8,161 points)
 Heptathlon winner:  Morgan Lake (5,896 points)
 May 31 & June 1: 40th Hypo-Meeting in  Götzis
 Decathlon winner:  Trey Hardee (8,518 points)
 Heptathlon winner:  Katarina Johnson-Thompson (6,682 points)
 June 14 & 15: 8th TNT Express Meeting in  Kladno
 Decathlon winner:  Oleksiy Kasyanov (8,083 points)
 Heptathlon winner:  Eliška Klučinová (6,460 points)
 June 26–29: US Championships in  Sacramento, California
 Decathlon winner:  Trey Hardee (8,599 points)
 Heptathlon winner:  Sharon Day-Monroe (6,470 points)
 June 28 & 29: 18th Erdgas Mehrkampf-Meeting in  Ratingen
 Decathlon winner:  Rico Freimuth (8,356 points)
 Heptathlon winner:  Lilli Schwarzkopf (6,426 points)
 July 5 & 6: European Cup Combined Events Super League in  Toruń
 Decathlon winner:  Eelco Sintnicolaas (8,156 points)
 Heptathlon winner:  Nadine Broersen (6,539 points)
 Overall title winner:  (41,159 points)
 July 5 & 6: European Cup Combined Events First and Second League in  Ribeira Brava
 First League decathlon winner:  Adam Helcelet (7,955 points)
 First League heptathlon winner:  Eliška Klučinová (6,191 points)
 Second League decathlon winner:  Niels Pittomvils (8,000 points)
 Second League heptathlon winner:  Sofia Yfantidou (5,806 points)
 Promotion to Super League:  (40,384 points)
 Relegated to First League:  (36,879 points)
 Note: Ribeira Brava replaced Donetsk in hosting the First and Second Leagues, due to the 2014 Crimean crisis.
 July 17 & 18: Pan American Combined Events Cup in  Ottawa
 Decathlon winner:  Yordanis Garcia (8,179 points)
 Heptathlon winner:  Natasha Jackson (5,928 points)
 July 27 – August 2: Part of the 2014 Commonwealth Games
 Decathlon winner:  Damian Warner (8,282 points)
 Heptathlon winner:  Brianne Theisen-Eaton (6,597 points)
 August 10–14: Part of the 2014 African Championships in Athletics
 Decathlon winner:  Larbi Bouraada (8,311 points)
 Heptathlon winner:  Marthe Koala (5,454 points)
 August 12–17: Part of the 2014 European Athletics Championships
 Decathlon winner:  Andrei Krauchanka (8,616 points)
 Heptathlon winner:  Antoinette Nana Djimou (6,551 points)
 September 20 & 21: Décastar in  Talence
 Decathlon winner:  Mikk Pahapill (8,077 points)
 Heptathlon winner:  Carolin Schäfer (6,383 points)
 September 26 – October 3: Part of the 2014 Asian Games in  Incheon (final)
 Decathlon -> Winner:  Keisuke Ushiro (8,088 points); Second:  Leonid Andreev (7,879 points); Third:  Akihiko Nakamura (7,828 points)
 Heptathlon -> Winner:  Ekaterina Voronina (5,912 points); Second:  Wang Qingling (5,856 points); Third:  Yuliya Tarasova (5,482 points)
 Overall winners:  Rico Freimuth (m) /  Nadine Broersen (f)
 May 24 & 25: 2014 IAAF World Relays at  Nassau (debut event)
 Men's 4 × 100 m team winner: 
 Men's 4 × 200 m team winner:  (World Record)
 Men's 4 × 400 m team winner: 
 Men's 4 × 800 m team winner: 
 Men's 4x1,500m team winner:  (World Record)
 Women's 4 × 100 m team winner: 
 Women's 4 × 200 m team winner: 
 Women's 4 × 400 m team winner: 
 Women's 4 × 800 m team winner: 
 Women's 4x1,500m team winner: 
 July 22–27: 2014 World Junior Championships in Athletics at  Eugene
 The  won both the gold and overall medal tallies.
 August 10–14: 2014 African Championships in Athletics in  Marrakesh
  won the gold medal tally.  won the overall medal tally.
 August 12–17: 2014 European Athletics Championships at  Zürich
  won the gold medal tally.  and Great Britain won 23 overall medals each.
 August 20–26: 2014 Summer Youth Olympics
 Host nation, won the gold medal tally.  and  won 8 overall medals each.
 September 13 & 14: 2014 IAAF Continental Cup at  Marrakesh
 Men: Team Europe won both the gold and overall medal tallies.
 Women: Team Americas won the gold medal tally. Team Europe won the overall medal tally.

Season's bests

 Two faster women's marathon times were set at the 2014 Boston Marathon: 2:18:57 by Rita Jeptoo and 2:19:59 by Buzunesh Deba. The Boston Marathon course, however, is ineligible for record purposes. Jeptoo also failed a doping test prior to setting the time, making it an invalid one.

References

Calendar. IAAF. Retrieved on 2014-04-18.
Season's bests
Rorick, Jim (2015-01-10). 2014 World Comprehensive List - Men. Track and Field News. Retrieved on 2015-02-07.
Rorick, Jim (2015-01-10). 2014 World Comprehensive List - Women. Track and Field News. Retrieved on 2015-02-07.

 
2014
Athletics